Thalia was a German magazine on history, theatre, culture, philosophy, literature and politics. It was set up in 1784 by Friedrich Schiller while he was poet to the National Theatre Mannheim. The headquarters was in Leipzig. Schiller's poem "An die Freude" was first published in Thalia in 1786. It was named after the ancient Greek Muse or Grace of the same name. It closed in 1791.

References

External links
WorldCat record

Cultural magazines published in Germany
Defunct literary magazines published in Germany
Defunct political magazines published in Germany
History magazines
Magazines established in 1784
Magazines disestablished in 1791
Magazines published in Leipzig
Philosophy magazines
Theatre magazines
Works by Friedrich Schiller